Neferkare Setepenre Ramesses IX (also written Ramses)  (originally named Amon-her-khepshef Khaemwaset) (ruled 1129–1111 BC) was the eighth pharaoh of the Twentieth Dynasty of Egypt. He was the third longest serving king of this Dynasty after Ramesses III and Ramesses XI. He is now believed to have assumed the throne on I Akhet day 21 based on evidence presented by Jürgen von Beckerath in a 1984 GM article. According to Papyrus Turin 1932+1939, Ramesses IX enjoyed a reign of 18 years and 4 months and died in his 19th Year in the first month of Peret between day 17 and 27. His throne name, Neferkare Setepenre, means "Beautiful Is The Soul of Re, Chosen of Re." Ramesses IX is believed to be the son of Mentuherkhepeshef, a son of Ramesses III, since Mentuherkhopshef's wife, the lady Takhat bears the prominent title of King's Mother on the walls of tomb KV10, which she usurped and reused in the late 20th Dynasty; no other 20th Dynasty king is known to have had a mother with this name. Ramesses IX was, therefore, probably a grandson of Ramesses III.

Tomb robberies

His reign is best known for the year 16 and year 17 tomb robbery trials, recorded in the Abbott Papyrus, the Leopold II-Amherst Papyrus, Papyrus BM 10054 and on the recto of both Papyrus BM 10053 and Papyrus BM 10068. It has been suggested that the undated Papyrus Mayer B, dealing with the plundering of the tomb of Ramesses VI, may also stem from his reign but, so far, this remains conjecture.

During these trials it became clear that several royal and noble tombs in the Western Theban Necropolis had been robbed, including that of a 17th Dynasty king, Sobekemsaf II. Paser, Mayor of Eastern Thebes or Karnak, accused his subordinate Paweraa, the Mayor of West Thebes responsible for the safety of the necropolis, of being either culpable in this wave of robberies or negligent in his duties of protecting the Valley of the Kings from incursions by tomb robbers. Paweraa played a leading part in the vizierial commission set up to investigate, and, not surprisingly, it proved impossible for Paweraa to be officially charged with any crime due to the circumstantiality of the evidence.  Paser disappeared from sight soon after the report was filed.

Projects

In the sixth year of his reign, he inscribed his titulature in the Lower Nubian town of Amara West. Most of his building works centre on the sun temple centre of Heliopolis in Lower Egypt where the most significant monumental works of his reign are located. However, he also decorated the wall to the north of the Seventh Pylon in the Temple of Amun-Re at Karnak. Finally, his name has been found at the Dakhla Oasis in Western Egypt and Gezer at Canaan which may suggest a residual Egyptian influence in Asia; the majority of the New Kingdom Empire's possessions in Canaan and Syria had long been lost to the Sea Peoples by his reign. He is also known for having honoured his predecessors Ramesses II, Ramesses III and Ramesses VII. He also paid close attention to Lower Egypt and built a substantial monument at Heliopolis.

Family
 
Ramesses IX is known to have had two sons: at Heliopolis, "a gateway was reinscribed with texts including the king's names and also those of the prince and High Priest Nebmaatre, who was fairly certainly his son." Ramesses IX's second son, Montuherkhopshef C, perhaps this king's intended heir, who did not live long enough to succeed his father, took over the former KV19 tomb of Sethirkhepsef B in the Valley of the Kings. The throne was instead assumed by Ramesses X whose precise relationship to Ramesses IX is unclear. Ramesses X might have been Ramesses IX's son, but this assumption remains unproven. Tomb KV19, which was one of the most beautifully decorated tombs in the royal valley, had been abandoned by Sethirkhepsef B when the latter assumed the throne as king Ramesses VIII and one of prince Montuherkhopshef's depictions there "bears the prenomen cartouche to Ramesses IX on its belt" thereby establishing the identity of this prince's father.  The tomb of Ramesses IX, KV6, has been open since antiquity, as is evidenced by the presence of Roman and Greek graffiti on the tomb walls. It is quite long in the tradition of the 'syringe' tunnels of the later 19th and 20th Dynasties and lies directly opposite the tomb of Ramesses II in the Valley of the Kings; this fact may have influenced Ramesses IX's choice of location for his final resting place due to its proximity to this great Pharaoh. While Ramesses IX's chief queen is not precisely identified in surviving Egyptian inscriptions, she was most likely Baketwernel.

Burial and rediscovery
In 1881, the mummy of Ramesses IX (nr. 5209) was found in the Deir el-Bahri cache (DB320) within one of the two coffins of Neskhons—wife of the Theban High Priest Pinedjem II. This pharaoh's mummy was not apparently examined by Grafton Elliot Smith and not included in his 1912 catalogue of the Royal Mummies. When the mummy was unwrapped by Maspero, a bandage was found from a year 5, mentioning the lady Neskhons, most probably from the reign of king Siamun. A further strip of linen from a year 7 identified the mummy as "Ra Khaemwaset" which can be taken as a reference to either Ramesses Khaemwaset Meryamun (IX) or Ramesses Khaemwaset Meryamun Neterheqainu (XI). But since an ivory box of Neferkare Ramesses IX was found in the royal cache itself, and Ramesses XI was probably never buried at Thebes but rather in Lower Egypt, "the [royal] mummy is most likely to be that of Ramesses IX himself." 
It is estimated that the king was about 50 years old when he died (but it is extremely difficult to correctly establish the age of mummies) and his mummy was found to have broken limbs, a broken neck and damage to its nose, which is missing.

In April 2021 his mummy was moved from the Egyptian Museum to the National Museum of Egyptian Civilization along with those of 17 other kings and 4 queens in an event termed the Pharaohs' Golden Parade.

In modern literature
The novel Ancient Evenings by Norman Mailer is told from the perspective of characters living during the reign of Ramesses IX, including Ramesses IX himself.  Most but not all of the novel takes place on one long evening in 1123 or 1122 BCE, during which the characters (including Ramesses IX) tell stories of the past. The majority of the book concerns the reign of Ramesses II, approximately 150 years before the night of the narrative; the Battle of Kadesh (1274 BCE) is in turn the central event of this sub-narrative.

See also
 Ramesses IX Tomb-plan Ostracon

References

Further reading
 Cyril Aldred, A statue of king Neferkarē' Ramesses IX, JEA 41 (1955), 3-8
 Amin A. M. A. Amer, Notes on Ramesses IX in Memphis and Karnak, Göttinger Miszellen 57 (1982), 11-16 
 Jürgen von Beckerath, Drei Thronbesteigungsdaten der XX. Dynastie, Göttinger Miszellen 79 (1984), 7-9
 Dylan Bickerstaffe, Refugees for eternity - The royal mummies of Thebes - part 4 - Identifying the Royal Mummies, Canopus Press, 2009
 Jac. J. Janssen, Once Again the Accession Date of Ramesses IX, Göttinger Miszellen 191 (2002), 59-65
 Gaston Maspero, Les momies royales de Deir el-Bahari, Paris, 1889, 566-568

External links

  The Tomb of Ramesses IX, Valley of the Kings, Egypt 

 
12th-century BC Pharaohs
Pharaohs of the Twentieth Dynasty of Egypt
Ancient Egyptian mummies
Year of birth unknown
1111 BC deaths